Solo un padre (also known as The Semi-Serious Adventures of a Single Father, Perfect Skin and Just a Father) is a 2008 Italian comedy-drama film directed by Luca Lucini. It is based on the novel Perfect Skin written by Nick Earls.

Cast 

Luca Argentero: Carlo
Diane Fleri: Camille
Claudia Pandolfi: Melissa
Anna Foglietta: Caterina
Fabio Troiano: Giorgio

References

External links

2008 films
Italian comedy-drama films
2008 comedy-drama films
Films directed by Luca Lucini
2000s Italian films